The 2022–23 Murray State Racers men's basketball team represented Murray State University in the 2022–23 NCAA Division I men's basketball season. The Racers were led by head coach Steve Prohm, who was in his first season (fifth overall) with the Racers, and played their home games at the CFSB Center in Murray, Kentucky as first-year members of the Missouri Valley Conference.

Previous season
The Racers finished the 2021–22 season 31–3, 18–0 in OVC play to finish as regular season champions. As the No. 1 seed, they defeated Southeast Missouri State and Morehead State to win the OVC tournament. They received the conference's automatic bid to the NCAA tournament as the No. 7 seed in the East Region, where they defeated San Francisco in the first round, before losing to Saint Peter's in the second round. 

On March 21, 2022, head coach Matt McMahon left the school to take the head coaching job at LSU. On March 28, the school named former Iowa State head coach Steve Prohm as the team's new head coach, who previously coached the Racers from 2006–2011 as an assistant and as head coach from 2011–2015.

The season was the team's last season as members of the Ohio Valley Conference, as they joined the Missouri Valley Conference in July 2022.

Roster

Schedule and results

|-
!colspan=12 style=| Exhibition

|-
!colspan=12 style=| Regular season

|-
!colspan=12 style=| MVC Tournament

Sources

References

Murray State Racers men's basketball seasons
Murray State Racers
Murray State Racers men's basketball
Murray State Racers men's basketball